John Fuller may refer to:
John Fuller (Massachusetts politician), representative to the Great and General Court
John Fuller (college head) (died 1558/9), Master of Jesus College, Cambridge
John Fuller (died 1744), British Member of Parliament for Plympton Erle, 1728–1734
John Fuller (1680–1745), British Member of Parliament for Sussex, 1713–1715
John Fuller (1706–1755), British Member of Parliament for Boroughbridge, 1754–1755
John Fuller (1732–1804), British Member of Parliament for Tregony, 1754–1761
Mad Jack Fuller (John Fuller, 1757–1834), English politician, philanthropist and patron of the arts, and Squire of the hamlet of Brightling
John W. Fuller (1827–1891), Union general
John Fuller (bushranger) (1830–1865), Australian bushranger
Sir John Fuller, 1st Baronet (1864–1915), British Liberal politician and Governor of Victoria
John G. Fuller (1913–1990), New England-based American author
John Fuller (poet) (born 1937), English poet and author
John Fuller (baseball) (born 1950), Major League baseball player
Johnny Fuller (born 1946), American football player
Johnny Fuller (musician) (1929–1985), American blues singer and guitarist
J. F. C. Fuller (John Frederick Charles Fuller, 1876–1966), British soldier
Jack Fuller (author), Pulitzer Prize for Editorial Writing-winning author and former editor and publisher of the Chicago Tribune 
Sir John Fuller (Australian politician) (1917–2009), New South Wales minister in the Robert Askin government
John L. Fuller (1910–1992), behavior geneticist
John Fuller (singer) (1850–1923), New Zealand singer and theatrical company manager
John Fuller (theatrical entrepreneur) (1879–1959), his son, New Zealand theatrical entrepreneur
John Augustus Fuller (1828–1902), British Army officer
John Doc Fuller, prison coach, motivational speaker and author
John Fuller (Montana politician), member of the Montana House of Representatives
John Fuller (cricketer) (1834–1893), English cricketer, clergyman and academic
John V. Fuller (born 1965), United States Navy admiral